A mercury swivel commutator is an electrical commutator typically used in electrophysiological experiments on head free or moving animals. Electrical recordings from stationary, head-fixed animals can be done with electrodes attached to a stereotaxic rig. The wires leading from the electrode can be connected to the amplifier and recording setup using regular wires, since no twisting occurs. Freely moving animals may turn through several revolutions in one direction. While recording from freely moving animals, therefore, an electrical commutator is needed to prevent twisting of the wires that go from the electrode (moving and rotating with the head) to the amplifier/recorder (fixed to the ground).

Traditional electrical commutators use slip rings for coupling. Slip rings however inject commutator noise into the connection. This is because as the contact points slide over the surface of the slip-rings they make microscopic bumps. The resultant variation in resistance and inductance  causes electrical noise in the circuit. To reduce the electrical noise the contact points need to be pressed against the slip rings with greater force. This leads to great resistance and a higher rate of wear.

Replacing the slip rings with pools of mercury — a conducting fluid — reduces commutator noise and friction, enabling commutator use for small weaker animals.

OEM machinery manufacturers are discovering the benefits of using a mercury swivel commutator in their designs. For example, packaging machines use some type of commutator or slip ring as a connection to the moving parts that are heated to seal the packages closed after they are filled. It is critical that the temperature sensing circuit be reliable and accurate. Unfortunately, using a slip ring assembly or standard electrical slip ring may cause problems due to electrical noise and degradation of signal produced by the rubbing contacts of the slip rings. Many OEM machinery manufacturers have switched to using mercury swivel commutators for reliable and accurate temperature control. It is also desirable to pass the power and the temperature signal through the same rotating electrical connector in order to minimize the number of connector parts that must be built into the machine. Multiple channel mercury swivel commutators are used for this purpose.

See also 
 Neuroscience
 Neurophysiology
 Single-unit recording
 Mercury switch

Electrophysiology
Electrical signal connectors